Every Bad is the second studio album by British indie rock band Porridge Radio. It was released on 13 March 2020 on the record label Secretly Canadian. The album was nominated for the 2020 Mercury Prize.

Critical reception
Every Bad was met with universal acclaim reviews from critics. At Metacritic, which assigns a weighted average rating out of 100 to reviews from mainstream publications, this release received an average score of 86, based on 15 reviews. In a video posted on Facebook in April 2020, Andrew Lloyd Webber included the song "Sweet" in his "Isolation Playlist".

Accolades

Track listing

Charts

References

2020 debut albums
Secretly Canadian albums
Indie rock albums by British artists
Albums produced by Jennifer Decilveo